Troskovice is a municipality and village in Semily District in the Liberec Region of the Czech Republic. It has about 90 inhabitants.

Administrative parts
Hamlets of Jivina, Křenovy and Tachov are administrative parts of Troskovice.

History
The first written mention of Troskovice is from 1388.

Sights
Troskovice is known for the ruins of Trosky Castle, the main landmark of the Bohemian Paradise.

References

Villages in Semily District